The Marchas Populares (Popular Marches) are a Portuguese tradition that dates back to 1932, when the first event took place in the capital city of Lisbon, under the direction of Leitão de Barros. It is one of several events that take place in the month of June as a celebration of the Portuguese Midsummer.

The Marchas are typically held at night, in the eve of a religious holiday. They consist of a thematic competition between teams that dress up with handmade outfits to march and dance through an open avenue or closed arena to the sound of popular music, mixing motifs of Portuguese summer culture, like "manjerico" and the sea. The participants of the several teams are usually residents of a certain neighbourhood, students, or members of a local organization.

Marchas Populares de Lisboa 

Although the Marchas are held at many towns and villages of Portugal, the most famous competition is the Marchas Populares de Lisboa, taking place each year during the official city holiday of St. Anthony, the Patron Saint of Lisbon, from the night of 12 June through 13 June. All districts of Lisbon become rivals for one night and compete for the podium of the contest, that is broadcast live on national television from the famous Avenida da Liberdade. The teams are sponsored by godparents, who are mediatic figures of the country or of the city of Lisbon. Some teams, like the child march of Voz do Operário, participate in the event as pure guests, and do not engage in the competition, that takes place exclusively among the neighbourhoods. During this night, the residents of the several districts of Lisbon typically go out to party in the street with friends and other residents, eating grilled sardines and drinking beer to the sound of Portuguese music.
The Marchas de Lisboa form an iconic cultural duo with the Casamentos de Santo António (Weddings of Saint Anthony), that are hold during the morning and afternoon of 12 June. Like the Marchas, the civil and catholic weddings are also broadcast on national television. The married couples of the ceremony also participate in the Marches by walking through the Avenue.

Although the official showcase and event happens on 12 June, the preparation for the Marches starts months before, for the teams to design and practice their performance. A common misconception is that the judge does not score the teams during the Marches per se; instead, the voting process is held a few days earlier, with a private show held at a closed stadium like Altice Arena.

Podium of the Marchas Populares de Lisboa 
The podium of the several editions of the Marchas Populares was the following:

Top places by neighbourhood 
The following table shows the number of top places achieved by each district, from 1990 to 2019.

References 

1932 establishments in Portugal
Annual events in Lisbon